Brand Factory was a chain of retail stores operated by Future Group. Its head office was in Mumbai. Launched in September 2006, it had 100 stores across 50 cities in India as of December 2018. It was India's largest discount retail chain and offered a wide range of apparel brands in different categories for men, women, infants, accessories, cosmetics, footwear, sportswear, and luggage. The chain had planned to expand its number of outlets to 100 by 2018. It was acquired by Reliance Industries in 2022.

The outlets were between 10,000 and 150,000 square feet in size and hosted several Indian and International fashion brands like Buffalo, Jack & Jones, Levis, Pepe Jeans, Wrangler, Provogue, Arrow, Nike, Adidas, Reebok, Raymond, Louis Phillippe, Ed Hardy, Allen Solly, Lee Cooper, WROGN, and Gini & Jony. It has stores in Amritsar, Chennai, Bhilai, Raipur, Bhubaneswar, Cuttack, Kanpur, Kolkata, Kollam, Hyderabad, Asansol, Bangalore, Mysore, Hubli, Jabalpur, Indore, Mangalore, Coimbatore, Guwahati, Trivandrum, Ahmedabad, Mumbai, Bhuj, Thane, Nagpur, Ujjain, Vijayawada, Visakhapatnam, Tirupati, Pune, Kalyan, Calicut, Patna, Vadodara, Salem, Lucknow, Agra, Nashik, Surat, Rajkot, Jaipur, Margao, Thrissur, Aurangabad, and Dehradun.

References

Companies based in Mumbai
Indian companies established in 2006
Retail companies established in 2006
Retail companies of India
2006 establishments in Maharashtra
Future Group